UDP-N,N'-diacetylbacillosamine 2-epimerase (hydrolysing) (UDP-Bac2Ac4Ac 2-epimerase, NeuC) is an enzyme with systematic name UDP-N,N'-diacetylbacillosamine hydrolase (2-epimerising). This enzyme catalyses the following chemical reaction

 UDP-N,N'-diacetylbacillosamine + H2O  UDP + 2,4-diacetamido-2,4,6-trideoxy-D-mannopyranose

This enzyme requires Mg2+. It is involved in biosynthesis of legionaminic acid.

References

External links 
 

EC 3.2.1